Ibrahim Al-Barakah (born 13 September 1996) is a Saudi Arabian professional footballer who plays as a midfielder for Al-Hazem.

Club career
Al Barakah started his career at Al-Taawoun in the Saudi Professional League, during the 2016–17 season. He made his debut against Al-Fayha. left Al-Taawoun and signed with Al-Mujazzal on August 20, 2018. left Al-Mujazzal and signed with Al-Bukayriyah on July 22, 2019. left Al-Bukayriyah and signed with Damac on September 16, 2020. On 25 October 2021, Al-Barakah joined Al-Hazem on loan. He won the MS League with Al-Hazem and gained promotion to the Pro League during the 2020–21 season. On 12 July 2021, Al-Barakah joined Al-Hazem permanently. On 31 August 2021, Al-Barakah was loaned out to Al-Fayha.

Honours
Al-Hazem
MS League: 2020–21

Al-Fayha
King Cup: 2021–22

References

External links 
 

1996 births
Living people
Saudi Arabian footballers
Al-Taawoun FC players
Al-Mujazzal Club players
Al-Bukayriyah FC players
Damac FC players
Al-Hazem F.C. players
Al-Fayha FC players
Saudi Professional League players
Saudi First Division League players
Association football midfielders